The Wilderness Survival Guide is a supplement to the Advanced Dungeons and Dragons (AD&D) role-playing game, written by Kim Mohan and published by TSR, Inc. in 1986.

Contents
The Wilderness Survival Guide covers adventures in the wilderness, including rules and guidelines for weather and its effects, encumbrance and movement, hunting, camping, first aid, natural hazards, fatigue, beasts of burden, and handling combat and magic in the wilderness. The book also details new equipment and skills, called proficiencies, pertaining to the wilderness. The book provides an overview of the types of wilderness, including desert, forest, hills, mountains, plains, coastal areas, and swamps.

Much of the material in the book details the environment, about terrains, major wilderness hazards, and weather. The book also covers PC resources, such as: adding to the proficiency system introduced in the Dungeoneer's Survival Guide; appropriate clothing for different climates; clarifying normal vision, infravision and ultravision; details on mounts; and rules on encumbrance and movement rates in the wilderness. The book also details how the environment affects PC activities, and includes new information on survival techniques, air and waterborne travel, combat in unusual circumstances, and magic.

In addition to new abilities, the Wilderness Survival Guide introduces difficulties and handicaps that players will have to cope with, such as the effects of sleeping in armor and the ease with which a fire can get out of hand. The book includes a short section entitled Starting from Scratch that shows how to design a bit of topography using a step-by-step method of creating a viable environment. It includes tables dealing with encumbrance (for characters and animals), effects of wind on missile fire and waterborne vehicle characteristics, including modifiers for a thief's climbing rates, climbing for non-thieves, temperature effects and damage, reactions of animals, and effects of lack of sleep. Most of the tables are reprinted at the back of the book, where there are also three pages containing different sizes of hex.

Publication history
Kim Mohan began working on the Wilderness Survival Guide in early April 1986, and he spent his time researching the wilderness and figuring how to translate this knowledge into rules for AD&D. The book features cover art by Jeff Easley, and was published by TSR in 1986 as a 128-page hardcover. The book features interior illustrations by Mark Nelson, Jim Holloway, Easley, Larry Elmore, and Valerie Valusek.

As it was a first edition AD&D title rendered out-of-date with the release of second edition AD&D, the book was discounted and re-packaged with the new Wild Things adventure pack in 1990 to clear out remaining stock.

In 1999, a paperback reprint of the first edition was released.

Reception
Carl Sargent reviewed Wilderness Survival Guide for White Dwarf No. 85, stating that a good wilderness adventure rulebook is hard to write, because of the lack of sharp discontinuities as opposed to dungeon adventures, although "Mohan has pulled it off brilliantly." Sargent called the weather system "splendid", and felt that the rules on encumbrance and movement rates "make sense and work easily". He noted some odd details, such as a draft horse being able to carry 80% of the load of an elephant, and the fact that druids gain wilderness proficiencies slower than any other class. However, he felt that "for every error there are a dozen good points of details; the WSG gets proficiency checks 'right', correcting a major DSG error". He felt that the book provides valuable material not only for AD&D, but for any D&D, RuneQuest, or Middle-earth Role Playing game master. Sargent praised Kim Mohan's writing style, calling the book "the best written rulebook I've ever read; indeed, for style and content the WSG is the best AD&D book to date". Sargent concluded his review by stating, "This book will revolutionize wilderness adventuring. It makes the wilderness more challenging, dangerous and exciting than almost any dungeon … Simply, the Wilderness Survival Guide is absolutely terrific.”

Robin Parry reviewed the Wilderness Survival Guide for the British magazine Adventurer #7 (February 1987). He points out the need for a DM to be prepared to deal with facts concerning the natural (and unnatural) world, in order to run a credible campaign: "No book can completely alleviate the need to develop the odd interest in, say, geology or obscure tribal customs, but the Wilderness Survival Guide answers most of the questions likely to be asked when players venture in the wilds." He comments that the book "deals with the many aspects of outdoor adventuring [...] with comprehensive clarity". He calls the Starting from Scratch section "sensible" and wonders "why this section is reserved for the Dungeon Master's eyes only, as it is no more revealing of pertinent facts than the rest of the book". He felt that the information on weather "is dealt with, as completely as anyone but the most niggling simulationist could wish. The system presented is eminently usable and covers (as do all the climatic bits) the tropic, the arctic, and everything in between."  He found some of the tables particularly useful, "although all the tables should prove valuable sooner or later". Parry complimented the look of the book: "Another admirable Jeff Easley illustration graces the cover, the drawings inside range from good to poor. Printing and production are, as usual, good; no typos or glaring gaps." He also complimented the writing: "Kim Mohan has written a worthy companion volume to Doug Niles' Dungeon Survival Guide, especially considering that the subject is much broader."

Reviews
 Casus Belli #36 (Feb 1987)

See also
 Fiend Folio

References

Dungeons & Dragons sourcebooks
Role-playing game supplements introduced in 1986